Catcher Icefall is an icefall between Elephant Cove and Bomford Peak on the south side of South Georgia. The UK Antarctic Place-Names Committee name was chosen for its association with the whaling industry.

References
 

Icefalls of Antarctica